C. Alton "Ary" Phillips was a college basketball player and Vicksburg businessman. He played for the Ole Miss Rebels. He was the school's first All-American. He also played baseball, and is a member of the M-Club Athletic Hall of Fame.

References

Sportspeople from Vicksburg, Mississippi
Ole Miss Rebels men's basketball players
Guards (basketball)